Double Contact is a 1999 science fiction book by Irish writer James White, the last in the Sector General series.

Clinton Lawrence described Double Contact as "in a very positive way, a throwback to an earlier era in science fiction" since it is optimistic and depicts several advanced species working harmoniously. The struggle to build trust and produce a successful first contact is, he thought, as exciting and suspenseful as one could wish for. However Lawrence also noted that the level of characterisation was the minimum required to support the plot.

This book has an unusual feature in personal pronoun usage: in most Sector General stories, one human is "he" or "she" (or other grammatical case forms) and one alien is "it". But, in Double Contact, often in the text the character Prilicla is "he" and a human or a member of any other species is "it".

References

1999 British novels
1999 science fiction novels
Novels by James White (author)
Sector General
Tor Books books